Marilyn Marshall may refer to:
Marilyn Marshall (singer)
Marilyn Marshall (footballer)